Jean Meyer (11 November 1924 – 18 April 2022) was a French historian who specialised in naval and maritime topics.

Biography 
Meyer taught history and geography at high schools in Nantes from 1953 to 1962, before becoming a professor at the University of Rennes from 1963 to 1978. He then became an emeritus at Paris Sorbonne-Paris IV and doctor honoris causa of the University of Marburg. Meyer died on 18 April 2022, at the age of 97.

Works 
 , Prix Albéric-Rocheron from the Académie Française in 1974.
 
 
 , Prix Eugène-Piccard from the Académie Française.
 
 , Prix Thérouanne from the Académie Française in 1982. 
 
  Prix Thiers from the Académie Française.
 
 
 
 
 
 
 
  Grand prix Gobert from the Académie Française in 1994.

Notes, citations, and references
Notes

Citations

References
 

1924 births
2022 deaths
20th-century French historians
French National Centre for Scientific Research scientists
Research directors of the French National Centre for Scientific Research
University of Rennes alumni
Academic staff of the University of Rennes
Officiers of the Ordre des Palmes Académiques
Officers of the Ordre national du Mérite
Writers from Strasbourg